The University of Ghana Primary School is a primary school located on the campus of the University of Ghana in Legon, Greater Accra Region, Ghana. It was established at a temporary location in Achimota in 1955 to educate the children of university faculty and staff.

Academics and houses
The school is organised into four houses; Primary (P), Secondary (S) and University (U). Students in the lower school from age 6-12 have all their lessons in their house groups, however in the Upper School (JSS) students have lessons with other form groups.

There is a broad curriculum at all levels in the school. Students in the lower school study about ten subjects including a local language and French and students in upper school can expect to study at least twelve subjects including a local language and French.

Student body
, the school had a student population of 2,221 pupils.

Traditions
The school is in Ghanaian terms a relatively old school and as a result has many traditions such as Friday morning spelling bees and math quizzes for pupils in the lower school. At the end of every academic year, students with the strongest results are awarded prizes at a ceremony held in the school's great hall. Also, there is an annual intersectional athletics and sports festival which has brought out many sports and athletics giants in Ghana.

Academic success
The school is non-selective, however, the majority of students achieve strong results and are offered places at secondary schools including the Achimota School, Presbyterian Boys' Senior High School (Presec), Holy Child High School, Ghana, Wesley Girls' Senior High School, St. Augustine's College and Mfantsipim Senior High School.

Headmasters
 Mrs. M. E. G. Black 1955-1960
 Janet Eavis 1961-1965
 K. O. Budu-Seidu 1970-1982
 E. Y. Attua-Afari 1983-1997
 Mrs. Esi Mensah -Bonsu 1997-2006
 Cecilia Morrison 2006-2013
 Alfred Codjoe Allotey (current head)

Alumni
 Senyuiedzorm Awusi Adadevoh - photojournalist
 Bernard Avle - journalist and public speaker
 Kofi Barnes - judge of the Ontario Superior Court of Justice
 Kwaku Bediako - fashion designer
 Kwabena Boahen - professor of Bioengineering and Electrical Engineering at Stanford University
 M.anifest - musician 
 Michael McClelland - Professor of Microbiology and Genetics at the University of California, Irvine
 Audrey Esi Swatson - youngest Ghanaian commercial pilot

See also

 Education in Ghana
 List of schools in Ghana

References

External links and sources
 UBS, Legon | Home

1955 establishments in Gold Coast (British colony)
Educational institutions established in 1955
Elementary and primary schools in Ghana
Greater Accra Region
University of Ghana